SS Mission Loreto was a Type T2-SE-A2 tanker built for the United States Maritime Commission during World War II. After the war she was acquired by the United States Navy as USS Mission Loreto (AO-116). Later the tanker transferred to the Military Sea Transportation Service as USNS Mission Loreto (T-AO-116).

Career 
Mission Loreto was laid down on 27 April 1944 under a Maritime Commission contract by Marine Ship Corporation, Sausalito, California; launched 28 June 1944; sponsored by Mrs. S. D. Bechtel; and delivered 22 July 1944. Operated, under charter, by Los Angeles Tanker Operators Inc., she spent the remainder of the War transporting fuel to Allied forces in the western Pacific, during which time she was awarded the National Defense Service Medal. She continued in these duties until 26 April 1946 when she was returned to the Maritime Commission and laid up in the Maritime Reserve Fleet at Mobile, Alabama.

Acquired by the Navy on 20 November 1947, she was placed in service with Naval Transportation Service on the same date as Mission Loreto (AO-116). On 1 October 1949 she was still performing these duties, but was under control of the new Military Sea Transportation Service and was designated USNS Mission Loreto (T-AO-116). She continued in these duties until 25 August 1955 when she was struck from the Naval Vessel Register and transferred to the Maritime Administration for lay up in the Maritime Reserve Fleet at Beaumont, Texas.

Reacquired by the Navy 25 June 1956 she was placed in service with MSTS on the same date and served until 13 July 1959 when she was once again returned to the Maritime Administration and laid up in the Maritime Reserve Fleet at Suisun Bay, California.

The ship was scrapped in Portland, Oregon in September 1975.

References

 
 

 

Type T2-SE-A2 tankers
Ships built in Sausalito, California
1944 ships
World War II tankers of the United States
Loreto
Type T2-SE-A2 tankers of the United States Navy